An information hazard, or infohazard, is "a risk that arises from the dissemination of (true) information that may cause harm or enable some agent to cause harm", as defined by philosopher Nick Bostrom in 2011, or contained in Information sensitivity. One example would be instructions for creating a thermonuclear weapon.

Classification 
Bostrom proposes the following types of information hazards, among many other types:

 Data hazards: A piece of data that can be used to harm others, such as the DNA sequence of a lethal pathogen.
 Idea hazards: General ideas that can harm others if fulfilled. One example is the idea of "using a fission reaction to create a bomb". Knowing this idea alone can be enough for a well-resourced team to develop a nuclear bomb.
 Knowing-too-much hazards: Information that if known, can cause danger to the person who knows it. For example, in the 1600s, women who knew about the occult were at a higher risk of being accused of witchcraft.

See also
 Censorship
 Classified information
 The Game (mind game)
 Information security
 Inquisition
 Jury nullification
 Knowledge (legal construct)
 Roko's basilisk
 Social media

References

Hazards
Information